Edwin Stanhope Sautelle (1872 – 1946) was an Australian civil engineer who was Town Clerk and later mayor of the Municipality of Vaucluse.

Early life
Sautelle was born in Yass, New South Wales, the second son of Ellen (née Besnard) and Edwin Sautelle. His father was an English born surveyor and his mother was Irish born. His brother was the grazier and champion polo player John Besnard Sautelle who was President of Bibbenluke Shire Council. Sautelle attended Fort Street Public School and then Newington College from 1886 until 1892.

Career
As a civil engineer he was town clerk at Vaucluse Council and designed the Parsley Bay suspension bridge. He later became an alderman on Vaucluse Council, serving twice as mayor. In 1895 he was appointed secretary of the South Head General Cemetery Trust. He designed the stone gates at the entrance to the cemetery. In 1938 he was charged  with forgery and larceny after misappropriating cemetery funds and sentenced to three years in gaol.

References

1872 births
1947 deaths
People educated at Newington College
Engineers from Sydney
20th-century Australian politicians
Mayors of places in Sydney